Eugène G. Grisot (19 December 1866 – 2 May 1936) was a French archer.  He won a gold medal at the 1908 Summer Olympics in London.  Grisot entered the men's double York round event in 1908, taking 19th place with 410 points.

In the Continental style event, he had considerably more success, scoring 263 points over 40 arrows to take 1st place in the event. Twelve years later he was able to win three more medals at the 1920 Summer Olympics in Antwerp.

References

Sources

External links
 Eugène Grisot on databaseOlympics.com
 Eugène Grisot's profile at Sports Reference.com

1866 births
1936 deaths
Archers at the 1908 Summer Olympics
Archers at the 1920 Summer Olympics
Olympic archers of France
French male archers
Olympic gold medalists for France
Olympic silver medalists for France
Olympic bronze medalists for France
Olympic medalists in archery
Medalists at the 1920 Summer Olympics
Medalists at the 1908 Summer Olympics
20th-century French people